Mikhail Matveyev may refer to:

 Mikhail Nikolaevich Matveyev (born 1968), Russian historian and communist politician
 Mikhail Rodionovich Matveyev (1892–1971), Soviet executioner